Michael Steven Park (22 June 1966 – 18 September 2005) was a rally co-driver from Newent in Gloucestershire. He worked with former world champions Richard Burns and Colin McRae as a gravel note expert while co-driving for both David Higgins and Mark Higgins in the British national series. His big break, however, came when he teamed up with the emerging Estonian talent Markko Märtin as a privateer pairing in a Toyota Corolla WRC for the 2000 World Rally Championship season.

After a number of strong performances, the pair were signed up by Subaru for 2001, before moving to Ford, where they evolved into one of the leading driver/co-driver combinations in the WRC. In 2003, they took two rally victories, in Greece and Finland, and improved on that figure with three wins in 2004 (Mexico, Corsica and Catalunya).

Park died as a result of injuries sustained in an accident on the final leg of Wales Rally Great Britain when his Peugeot 307 WRC left the road and struck a tree. Märtin and Park were lying fourth in the 2005 season's title race at the time, after securing four podiums in a season dominated by Citroën's Sébastien Loeb. Their performances had been instrumental in Peugeot's challenge for the manufacturer's championship, with the team lying six points behind French rivals Citroën.

After the crash, Märtin said "Park wasn't my co-driver, I was his pilot." Park's death was the first top-level rallying fatality since Rodger Freeth in the 1993 Rally Australia, and brought renewed attention to safety issues in the motorsport world.

On 20 June 2006, a memorial for Park was unveiled in Tallinn, Estonia.

WRC victories
{|class="wikitable"
! Number
! Event
! Season
! Driver
! Car
|-
| 1
|  50 th BP Ultimate Acropolis Rally of Greece
| rowspan=2 |2003
| rowspan=5 |Markko Märtin
| rowspan=3 |Ford Focus RS WRC 03
|-
| 2
|  53rd Neste Rally Finland
|-
| 3
|  18º Corona Rally México
| rowspan=3 |2004
|-
| 4
|  48ème Tour de Corse - Rallye de France
| rowspan=2 |Ford Focus RS WRC 04
|-
| 5
|  40º Rallye Catalunya-Costa Brava (Rallye de España)
|}

External links

BBC News report of death
Michael Park Fund (incorporating RB Foundation)
Ingrassia wins Michael Park ‘Beef’ trophy wrc.com

1966 births
2005 deaths
People from Newent
English rally drivers
British rally co-drivers
Racing drivers who died while racing
World Rally Championship co-drivers
Sportspeople from Gloucestershire
Sport deaths in Wales